Salliqueló is a town in Buenos Aires Province, Argentina. It is the administrative headquarters for Salliqueló Partido.

External links

 Local website

Populated places in Buenos Aires Province
Populated places established in 1903
1903 establishments in Argentina